HomeKit, also known as Apple Home, is a software framework developed by Apple Inc., made available in iOS and iPadOS that lets users configure, communicate with and control smart-home appliances using Apple devices. It provides users with a way to automatically discover such devices and configure them. By designing rooms, items, and actions in HomeKit, users can enable automatic actions in the home through a simple voice command to Siri or through the Home app. With HomeKit, developers are able to create complex applications in order to manage accessories at a high level. HomeKit is simply a communication protocol, which integrates and operates several types of accessories within the home.

Overview
HomeKit was created for several reasons. The main reason was to make tasks inside the home easier. It was created to provide people with methods and different tools to change and adapt certain home capabilities to their specific desires. This was done to compensate for the on-going request of user-system co-evaluation. HomeKit manages connected home appliances through the HomeKit Accessory Protocol (HAP). Messages from HomeKit are continuously being sent by powered devices, which are connected to HomeKit. They incorporate fields which recognize the specific accessory and what category it is under. Each category, also, has a code that is used to identify what the device is. It, also, identifies with the Global State Number (GSN). This number is increased each time that the state of the accessory is altered. Like most Apple devices, Apple Continuity Protocols are used. Continuity protocols consist of wireless technologies, such as Bluetooth/BLE and WiFi. They can be conducted through device-to-device connection. HomeKit uses Bluetooth, and Wi-Fi protocols. On HomePods and some Apple TVs, Thread is also used to connect and communicate with devices. Manufacturers of HomeKit-enabled devices are required to enroll in the MFi Program, and initially all HomeKit-based products were required to include an encryption co-processor. The latter requirement was later changed in iOS 11, which added support for software-based authentication. Equipment manufactured without HomeKit support can be enabled for use through a "gateway" product, a bridge that connects those devices to the HomeKit service.

HomeKit primarily competes with smart home standards from Amazon and Google. As of October 2019, Apple lists 450 devices compatible with HomeKit, compared to 10,000 for Google and 85,000 for Amazon.

Matter
On December 18, 2019, Apple announced that it will be working closely with Samsung, Amazon, and Google to create an open standard for smart home automation called Matter. Matter aims to reduce fragmentation across different vendors, and achieve interoperability among smart home devices and Internet of things (IoT) platforms from different providers. The project was delayed to fall 2022 due to "unprecedented interest" by the Connectivity Standards Alliance (CSA). Version 1.0 of Matter was published on the October 4, 2022.

Device categories 
HomeKit currently supports the following device categories (an extended list):

Garage doors, locks, security systems, and windows are categorized as secure appliances, and require a device with authentication such as an iPhone or iPad to unlock.

Home hub
iPads (supporting iOS 10 or later), Apple TVs (4th generation or newer) and HomePods can be used as a home hub to control HomeKit appliances remotely, grant guest access, and set up automations. Support for Thread was added in the HomePod Mini, second generation HomePod, and Apple TV 4K (2nd generation). Automations based on temperature and humidity are supported by the HomePod Mini and second generation HomePod.

The third-generation Apple TV only supports remote access. The use of iPads as a home hub was deprecated with iPadOS 16; iPads will not support Matter and new architectures being extended to Apple TV and HomePod, but will retain all previous functionality.

Home app

iPhone, iPad and Apple Watch
HomeKit was introduced on iPhones and iPads on September 17, 2014, with iOS 8. The framework allowed third-party apps to interface with HomeKit devices using Siri and allow remote access through home hubs.

The Home app, which unifies all devices into one app, was introduced on iPhones and iPads on September 13, 2016, with iOS 10, and on Apple Watches with watchOS 3. The app also added support for automations using a home hub, and preprogrammed "scenes", which can set multiple devices using a single command.

HomePod
The HomePod supported HomeKit at launch in February 2018. It lacks a graphical user interface to control HomeKit devices and instead uses Siri voice commands.

Mac
The Home app was introduced on Macs with macOS 10.14 Mojave, which was released on September 24, 2018.

Apple TV
Fourth-generation and newer Apple TVs can control HomeKit devices using Siri voice commands. tvOS 14, which was released on September 16, 2020, added direct control of HomeKit devices in Control Center and camera feeds and picture-in-picture monitoring for HomeKit-enabled security cameras. Neither the HomePod nor Apple TV can unlock or open secure appliances like locks.

See also 
 HomePod
 IFTTT
 Matter (standard)

References

External links 
 Apple Products Page
 Homebridge, an open source implementation of the Apple Home Automation Protocol
 HomeKit Subreddit
 HomeKit Framework
 HomeKit Developer Guide
 Apple's Developing for HomeKit guide

IOS-based software made by Apple Inc.
IOS
Home automation
Apple Inc. software